Made of Honor (Made of Honour in the United Kingdom, Ireland, Canada, and Australia) is a 2008 American romantic comedy film directed by Paul Weiland and written by Adam Sztykiel, Deborah Kaplan, and Harry Elfont. The film stars Patrick Dempsey, Michelle Monaghan, and Sydney Pollack, in his final screen appearance prior to his death less than a month after the film's release.

The plot follows a lifelong playboy who falls in love with his best friend, only to have her get engaged and ask him to be her maid of honor. It was released by Columbia Pictures in the United States on May 2, 2008. The film garnered negative reviews from critics who criticized the formulaic humor and script, but grossed $106.4 million worldwide against a $40 million budget making it a box office success.

Plot

On Halloween night in his senior year at Cornell University, Tom Bailey, Jr., dressed as Bill Clinton, entered the dark dorm room of Monica, his pre-arranged date, finding someone in bed. Thinking it was Monica, he climbed in and she sprayed him in the face.

It was actually Hannah – Monica's roommate, a "library geek", while Tom was a "Casanova". He was intrigued as she was different from the rest. When Hannah and Tom returned to the dorm room, a drunken Monica was there waiting, but he didn't stay.

Ten years later, Tom is now wealthy in NYC as his "coffee collar" invention pays him a dime every time one is used. Hannah, also in the city, has stayed best friends with him ever since that night in college, for their honesty. Tom continues to sleep with a different girl every week, while Hannah stays single, focusing on her career at the MET. 

Tom takes Hannah to his father's sixth wedding. When they dance, she feels attracted to him, however he is totally clueless. Always thinking of her as his best friend, he friendzones her so they have never slept together. 

Hannah has a 6-week-work trip to Scotland. Tom realizes that, being with a different woman week after week isn't fulfilling when he can't see Hannah. Realizing he has feelings for Hannah (to everyone's surprise), Tom decides to tell her when she returns. 

However, Hannah does not come back alone; she brings Colin, a wealthy Scottish royal, as her fiancé. Asking Tom to be her maid of honor he, to his shock, accepts. He does so to spend time with Hannah, convince her to stop the wedding and win her heart. It is not easy, as Colin is not only a Duke, but also triumphs at basketball. 

As Hannah's maid of honor, Tom is introduced to the three bridesmaids. One is Melissa, Hannah's cousin and an ex, whose heart he broke and now is jealous with Tom that she isn't the maid of honor. Thus, when he throws the bridal shower, Melissa sabotages it by tricking him into inviting a sex toy salesman as a party entertainer. 

Believing it was Tom's idea, Hannah gets upset and almost fires Tom, but thanks to his friends' How To Be A Perfect M-O-H 101 course, he wins her trust back. Taking her shopping, he impresses her with a plate-juggling performance. Hannah enjoys it, but tells Tom she is moving to Scotland after the wedding.

Tom, almost accepting defeat, continues being a responsible M-O-H by traveling to Scotland with Hannah. After their arrival at Eilean Donan Castle, he meets Colin's family. They have a variant of the Highland Games, in which the groom competes to prove himself worthy of his bride. Tom also participates, hoping to defeat Colin, but he loses in the last round.

At the family dinner: Colin's family proudly tells Hannah (who opposes to the killing and eating of animals) that every plate of meat on the table is from animals that Colin killed. Tom, who understands how uncomfortable Hannah feels, offers to help go over her vows. But, as he starts telling her his feelings, the other bridesmaids interrupt, dragging Hannah to her bachelorette party. 

Hannah has to give every man in the pub a peck for a coin (Scottish tradition), including Tom. When it is his turn, without anyone looking, he kisses her as passionately as possible, and though surprised, she kisses back. 

That night, Hannah goes to Tom's room to talk about their kiss, finding him under Melissa (the ex) who is trying to seduce him. Seeing Hannah at the door, he pushes Melissa off and runs after her. Hannah refuses to let Tom in and, behind the closed door with running tears, she tells him she is still marrying Colin the next day. The distressed Tom gives up being the M-O-H as he cannot bear to watch them marry.

As he is leaving the next morning, Tom suddenly turns back. However, the only ferry to the church already left. Luckily, he manages to borrow a horse from the locals. As he is riding up to the church doors, the horse stops, sending him flying through the chapel doors.

Hannah cannot believe Tom is back for her. She rushes to help him stand as he finally declares his love. She kisses him passionately in front of everyone. Colin punches him in the face for it.

Tom and Hannah go back to New York together, getting married on a rooftop under the stars and live happily ever after.

Cast

Production

The filming schedule was 26 days to accommodate Patrick Dempsey's commitments to Grey's Anatomy. Dempsey was part of the project before the director was chosen and agreed to Weiland after seeing an early cut of his coming-of-age film Sixty-Six. The scene where Dempsey juggles plates was not in the script and was added on the day.

Eilean Donan castle, famously the home of Connor MacLeod in the Highlander film, was used for exterior shots of one of the McMurray family homes.

Release
Made of Honor was originally rated R for "some sex-related material", but was later rated PG-13 for "sexual content and language". In Australia, it is rated M. In Sweden, the Swedish National Board of Film Censors rated the uncut version as suitable for all ages.

In the UK the British Board of Film Certification (BBFC) rated it a 12 for "Moderate Language and Sex References". When released on DVD, it was rated 12 for "Strong Sex References".

Reception

Box office 
In its opening weekend, the film grossed $15.5 million in 2,729 theaters in the United States and Canada, averaging $5,679 per theater, and ranking #2 at the box office behind Iron Man. It grossed a total of $46 million in North American and $60 million internationally, for a total worldwide gross of $106 million, against its $40 million budget.

Made of Honor was released on DVD and Blu-ray on September 16, 2008.

Critical response
Made of Honor received negative reviews from critics, and was called a gender swapped version of My Best Friend's Wedding. The site's critical consensus reads: "Sharp performances by Patrick Dempsey and Michelle Monaghan can't save this forgettable, formulaic chick flick from its comic failings." On Metacritic, the film holds a weighted average score of 37 out of 100, based on 25 critics, indicating "generally unfavorable reviews". Audiences surveyed by CinemaScore gave the film a grade "B+" on scale of A to F.

Keith Phipps of The A.V. Club gave the film an overall C grade, giving credit to the performances of Pollack and Monaghan for being surprisingly good in a by-the-numbers romantic story alongside Dempsey displaying "plastic sincerity" in his role, saying: "It's telling that he's followed by a string of sidekicks apparently created to make him less bland by comparison." The New York Times Stephen Holden commended the punch-up of the script for adding "tart satirical flavors to a cotton-candy formula" and the screen presence of both Dempsey and Monaghan, highlighting the latter for giving "enough sweetness to satisfy the cotton-candy addicts." Barbara Vancheri of the Pittsburgh Post-Gazette praised the utilization of the "picturesque, romantic" Scotland setting and the cast's willingness to perform, despite devolving into slapstick comedy and tacking on a 1940s film ending. She concluded by explaining its release alongside Iron Man saying: "Made of Honor is made to order for women or couples looking for an alternative to the comic-book adaptation and for a romcom with such obvious and memorable film forebears, it's still breezy fun."

Elizabeth Weitzman from the New York Daily News gave credit to Dempsey for his comedic timing over material containing "snickering emasculation" and director Paul Weiland for his "brisk pace" direction over "a lazy script from three screenwriters who take the low road every time." She concluded that: "The cinematic equivalent of a cookie-cutter wedding, Made of Honor ultimately feels a little depressing." Philip Marchand of the Toronto Star noted how the film's content contains "numerous references to insecure masculinity", saying that: "It's often a problem to determine when a movie is satirizing characters from a superior height and when it's sharing the mental level of those characters." Peter Bradshaw of The Guardian said about the film beyond its "gibberish" title: "Everything else about it is plasticky and nonsensical with no one behaving like a real carbon-based life-form. Monaghan's charm is stifled, and a classy cameo from Sydney Pollack as Dempsey's scapegrace dad goes for nothing. A film to leave at the altar." Ed Gonzalez from Slant Magazine called the film "soul-crushingly predictable", lamenting the misuse of Pollack's "ostensible prestige" only for it to be diminished by Kevin Sussman's character, unfunny sex jokes, an irritating soundtrack and defamation of Scottish people.

The film was nominated for Choice Movie - Bromantic Comedy at the 2008 Teen Choice Awards, but ultimately lost to What Happens in Vegas.

References

External links

 
 
 

2008 films
2008 romantic comedy films
2000s American films
2000s British films
2000s English-language films
American films about Halloween
American romantic comedy films
British films about Halloween
British romantic comedy films
Columbia Pictures films
Films about weddings
Films directed by Paul Weiland
Films produced by Neal H. Moritz
Films scored by Rupert Gregson-Williams
Films set in 1998
Films set in 2008
Films set in Manhattan
Films set in Scotland
Original Film films
Relativity Media films